Olisthopus parmatus is a species of ground beetle in the family Carabidae. It is found in North America.

Subspecies
These two subspecies belong to the species Olisthopus parmatus:
 Olisthopus parmatus iterans Casey
 Olisthopus parmatus parmatus

References

Further reading

 

Olisthopus
Articles created by Qbugbot
Beetles described in 1823